WKBC (800 AM) is a radio station in North Wilkesboro, North Carolina, United States.  WKBC is licensed to broadcast with 1,000 watts in the daytime and 308 watts at night. The station is operated by Wilkes Broadcasting Company, Inc.

Programming
WKBC plays American Country music.

WKBC's morning show, hosted by Steve Handy, features the "WKBC Hometown Opry" the second Friday of each month. The Opry features live performances by local, regional, and even national folk and bluegrass musicians. Wilkes County's location as the site of the annual MerleFest - the largest folk and bluegrass music festival in the nation - has led to the Hometown Opry attracting prominent musicians in folk and bluegrass music.

Eric Ellis, a regular on "Hometown Opry", was inducted into the Blue Ridge Music Hall of Fame in January 2009.

History
WKBC began broadcasting at 5 a.m. June 27, 1947, owned and operated by the Wilkes Broadcasting Company. Besides local programming, it used the World Broadcasting System transcription service.

References

External links

Wilkes County, North Carolina
Country radio stations in the United States
KBC
KBC
Radio stations established in 2009